Marius Paul Tigoianu (born 22 September 1988) is a Romanian footballer who plays as right winger for Voința Balta-Albă.

References

External links
 
 

1989 births
Living people
People from Râmnicu Sărat
Romanian footballers
Association football midfielders
Liga I players
Liga II players
Liga III players
FC Astra Giurgiu players
AFC Săgeata Năvodari players
FC Gloria Buzău players
FC Delta Dobrogea Tulcea players
FCV Farul Constanța players